A Matica or Matice or Matitsa is a Slavic concept of a foundation which promotes national culture and gained prominence during the 19th-century romantic nationalism.

In this context, the word matica is translated as  queen bee or queen ant.

The matica structure has been particularly used among the West Slavic peoples and South Slavic peoples:

 Matica srpska, formed in the Austrian Empire in 1826
 Matice česká, formed in the Austrian Empire in 1831
 Matice moravská, formed in the Austrian Empire in 1849
 Matice slezská, formed in Austria-Hungary in 1877
 Matica hrvatska, formed in the Austrian Empire in 1842
 Maćica Serbska, formed in Kingdom of Saxony in 1847
 Matytsia Halytsko-Ruska, formed in the Austrian Empire  in 1848
 Matica slovenská, formed in the Austrian Empire in 1863
 Slovenska matica, formed in the Austrian Empire in 1864
 Macierz Polska, formed in Austria-Hungary  in 1882
 Balgarska matitsa, formed in the Ottoman Empire in 1909
 Matica crnogorska, formed in Serbia and Montenegro in 1993

The term has additionally been used to refer to:
 Matica hrvatskih sindikata, Association of Croatian Public Sector Unions
 The magazine Matica, published by Matica crnogorska

References

Pan-Slavism
Slavic history